The Lazic War, also known as the Colchidian War or  in Georgian historiography as the Great War of Egrisi was fought between the Byzantine Empire and the Sasanian Empire for control of the ancient Georgian region of Lazica. The Lazic War lasted for twenty years, from 541 to 562, with varying success and ended in a victory for the Persians, who obtained an annual tribute in exchange for ending the war. The Lazic War is narrated in detail in the works of Procopius of Caesarea and Agathias.

Lazica
Lazica, situated on the eastern shore of the Black Sea, and controlling important mountain passes across the Caucasus and to the Caspian Sea, had a key strategic importance for both empires. For Byzantines, it was a barrier against a Persian advance through Iberia to the coasts of the Black Sea. Persians on the other side hoped to gain access to the sea, and control a territory from which Iberia, which was by now under their firm domination, could be threatened.

Lazica featured a difficult terrain and was surrounded by naturally impregnable borders. Besides, it was protected by strong fortresses, including Petra, Archaeopolis, Sarapanis,
Skande, Phasis, Rhodopolis, Uchimerion, Kotayon, Onoguris, Trachea, Sebastopolis and Pitius.

Background 
The Persian Sasanians recognized Lazica (Egrisi) as part of the Roman/Byzantine sphere of influence by the "Eternal Peace" Treaty of 532. By that time, in order to foster their influence over the local monarchy, the Byzantines had insisted on the conversion of the King, Tzath I: he received both baptism and royal attributes in Constantinople, from Emperor Justin I (Justinian's predecessor), in 522/3. Byzantine garrisons were stationed in Lazica and in neighboring Abasgia, mostly in the coastal cities of Poti, Sebastopolis and Pityus. The kingdom's capital, Archaeopolis, was fortified, as well as the southern access to the kingdom on the coastal road at Petra (present-day Tsikhisdziri, north of Batumi). In 536, however, the Byzantine presence turned into a full protectorate, as the king lost many powers to the new magister militum per Armeniam  John Tzibus. When Tzibus curtailed the freedom of trade of Lazic tradesmen to advance Byzantine interests, the popular dissatisfaction led to a full-scale uprising in 541, and the weakened king, Gubazes II, secretly sought Persian assistance against the Byzantines.

War 

Those calls were answered that year by the Persian king Khosrow I, who entered Lazica, captured the Byzantine main stronghold of Petra, and established another protectorate over the country. Khosrow I retreats to Persia a year later after an abortive invasion of Commagene. In 543, a Roman invasion of Armenia was defeated by a small Persian force at Anglon, and Khosrow I unsuccessfully besieges Edessa in Mesopotamia a year later. A peace treaty is signed in 545.

In Lazica, Khosrow I's attempt to establish direct Persian control over the country and the missionary zeal of the Zoroastrian priests soon caused discontent in Christian Lazica and King Gubazes revolted in 548, this time against the Persians. Gubazes II requested aid from Emperor Justinian I and brought Alans and Sabirs to an alliance. Justinian sent 7,000 Roman and 1,000 Tzani (relatives of the Lazs) auxiliaries under Dagisthaeus to assist Gubazes, and besieged the Petra fortress, but faced tough resistance from its heavily outnumbered garrison. Persian reinforcements under Mihr-Mihroe defeated a small Byzantine force guarding the mountain passes and then relieved the besieged Petra. Lacking enough supplies, Mihr-Mihroe garrisoned 3,000 men in the fortress and marched to Armenia leaving 5,000 soldiers to supply Petra. This force was destroyed by Dagisthaeus at the Phasis river in 549. The next Persian offensive also proved to be unsuccessful with the commander Chorianes killed in a decisive battle at the river Hippis (now the Tskhenistskali). Nevertheless, the Persians manage to resupply Petra. The new Byzantine commander Bessas quelled a pro-Persian revolt of the Abasgi tribe, took and dismantled the fort of Petra after a lengthy siege and fierce fighting as Mihr-Mihroe didn't arrive in time. The latter unsuccessfully diverts his force against Archaeopolis in 551 as many of his men are lost due to a lack of supplies. However, the latter was unopposed elsewhere in the field and managed to capture Cotais and the Uthimereos fortress blocking the important roads to the highland regions of Scymnia and Souania, which were also captured by him later. In the summer of 555, he dislodged a superior Byzantine-Lazic force at Telephis and Ollaria by stratagem and forced them to retreat to Nesos. Nachoragan replaced Mihr-Mihroe as the latter died of illness shortly after.

King Gubazes quarreled with Byzantine commanders Bessas, Martin, and Rusticus, complaining to emperor Justinian. Bessas was recalled, but Rusticus and his brother John eventually murdered Gubazes. To redress this with a victory on the battlefield, the Byzantine generals launched a full-scale assault at Onoguris, which was repulsed by a small force under Nachoragan who momentarily took and destroyed the main Byzantine base at Archaeopolis, which Mihr-Mihroe had twice tried and failed to take. These defeats and the murder of the Lazic king caused a bitter feud between the Lazic and Byzantine generals. The Lazi people got the Emperor to nominate Tzathes, the younger brother of Gubazes, as their new king, and Senator Athanasius investigated the assassination. Rusticus and John were arrested, tried, and executed. In 556, the allies retook Archaeopolis and routed Nachoragan in his abortive attack on Phasis. In the autumn and winter of the same year, the Byzantines suppressed a rebellion staged by the mountain tribe of the Misimians, and finally made peace.

Outcome 

Then, in 557, a truce ended the hostilities between the Byzantines and Persians, and by the "Fifty Years Peace" of Dara of 562, Khosrow I recognized Lazica as a Byzantine vassal state for an annual payment of gold.

See also
Iberian War

References

Sources

External links 
 History of the Later Roman Empire by J. B. Bury
 Wars of Justinian I

 
Wars of Justinian I
Roman–Sasanian Wars
Invasions of Georgia (country)
6th-century conflicts
6th century in Iran
6th century in the Byzantine Empire
6th century in Georgia (country)
Wars of Khosrow I
Wars involving the Sasanian Empire